KLFG (89.5 FM) is a radio station that serves the Fort Dodge, Iowa area. The station broadcasts a Contemporary Christian music format airing Educational Media Foundation's K-Love network programming.

The transmitter and broadcast tower are located four miles north of Badger, Iowa along Hwy P52.

On May 29, 2015, Family Stations, Inc. filed an application to sell the then-KIFR, KEAF and four translators to Educational Media Foundation. KIFR would air EMF's K-Love network. Educational Media bought the six licenses for $553,750.

The station changed its call sign to the current KLFG on November 20, 2015, coincident with the consummation of the sale to EMF.

References

External links

K-Love radio stations
Fort Dodge, Iowa
Radio stations established in 2005
2005 establishments in Iowa
Contemporary Christian radio stations in the United States
Educational Media Foundation radio stations
LFG